Carmine is a pigment of a bright-red color.

Carmine may also refer to:

 Carmine (color), deep red colors
 Carmine (given name)
 Carmine (surname)
 Carmine, Texas
 Carmine Church, Carrara, Italy
 Carmine Quartet, the chamber music group
 Indigo carmine, a salt of indigo
 Northern carmine bee-eater
 Southern carmine bee-eater

See also
Carmin (disambiguation)

Italian masculine given names